Vasile Ungureanu (born 4 March 1957) is a Romanian water polo player. He competed in the men's tournament at the 1980 Summer Olympics.

References

1957 births
Living people
Romanian male water polo players
Olympic water polo players of Romania
Water polo players at the 1980 Summer Olympics
Place of birth missing (living people)